Madang Urban LLG is a local-level government (LLG) of Madang Province, Papua New Guinea.

Wards
81. Madang Urban

References

Local-level governments of Madang Province